Dioscorea floridana, the Florida yam, is a plant species native to Florida, Alabama, Georgia and South Carolina. It grows in wet and sandy places at low elevations.

Dioscorea floridana is a perennial vine twining over other vegetation and spreading by means of yellow underground rhizomes. Stems can reach a height of over 4 m off the ground. Leaves are egg-shaped to triangular, up to 12 cm long, not clasping the stem. Flowers are yellow-orange.

References

floridana
Flora of the Southeastern United States
Plants described in 1910
Flora without expected TNC conservation status